Fatmir Hima (born April 20, 1954) is a former Albanian footballer who played with the Albanian football team KS Lokomotiva (now Teuta) of the city of Durrës from 1972 to 1985.

Honours 
Fatmir Hima was honored by the Albanian Football Association in 2013 for his sporting activity and achievements.

References 

1954 births
Living people
Footballers from Durrës
Albanian footballers
Association football forwards
KF Teuta Durrës players
Kategoria Superiore players